Koki is one of a number of towns in Senegal with this name.  This is the one in Louga region.

Transport 

It is served by a station on the mainline of the Dakar-Niger Railway.

Notable People 
Mbaye Diagne, a Senegalese Military Officer and United Nations Military Observer who was credited with saving many lives during the Rwandan genocide was born in Koki.

See also 

 Railway stations in Senegal

References 

Populated places in Louga Region